Remanella is a genus of karyorelict ciliates, belonging to family Loxodidae. Whereas Remanella inhabits brackish and marine waters, Loxodes – the other loxodid genus – is a freshwater taxon.

Etymology 
The genus name is a patronym honoring the German zoologist Adolf Remane (1898–1976), who contributed to the discovery of the marine interstitial fauna.

Phylogeny 
Molecular phylogeny based on sequences of the SSU rRNA gene suggests that the genus Remanella might be paraphyletic  with respect to a monophyletic genus Loxodes but this result is not strongly supported.

Species list 
At least 18 species are recognized in the genus Remanella:

References

External links 
 

Karyorelictea
Ciliate genera